Don't F**k with Cats: Hunting an Internet Killer is a 2019 true crime docuseries about an online manhunt. It is written & directed by Mark Lewis and was released on Netflix on December 18, 2019. The series chronicles events following a crowd-sourced amateur investigation into a series of animal cruelty acts committed by Canadian pornographic actor Luka Magnotta, culminating in his murder of Chinese international student Jun Lin. It was one of Netflix's Top 5 most-watched documentaries of 2019.

Premise
The three-part docuseries follows a group of amateur internet sleuths who launched a manhunt for Luka Magnotta after he gained international notoriety in 2010 for sharing a graphic video online of himself killing two kittens in a plastic bag, and suffocating them with a vacuum cleaner. Magnotta was later convicted for murdering Chinese international student Jun Lin in grisly circumstances in 2012.

Early investigation 
The series started with Deanna Thompson, a data analyst for a casino in Las Vegas, and John Green, from Los Angeles. In 2010, a viral video called 1 boy 2 kittens was linked on Facebook and posted on YouTube. The video shows a man playing with two kittens before he puts them in a very tight vacuum seal bag and vacuums out the air, suffocating the kittens. Thompson and Green subsequently started a Facebook group to build evidence and find the perpetrator. The group worked together to examine the details of the video, including the objects in the room, to help solve the mystery.

Cast

Episodes

Reception
Two weeks after its debut, the docuseries became one of Netflix's Top 5 most-watched documentaries of 2019. On the review aggregator website Rotten Tomatoes, the series has a 69% approval rating, based on 13 reviews, with an average rating of 8.3/10. The website's consensus reads, "Don't F**k With Cats offers an intriguing tale, but questionable intent and muddled storytelling make it a hard sell for anyone but true crime completists."

Accolades

|-
!scope="row" style="text-align:center;" rowspan="4"| 2020
| British Academy Television Awards
| Best Factual Series or Strand
| Mark Lewis, Felicity Morris, Michael Harte and Dimitri Doganis
| 
| rowspan="3" style="text-align:center;"|
|-
| rowspan="2"| British Academy Television Craft Awards
| Best Director: Factual
| Mark Lewis
| 
|-
| Best Editing: Factual
| Michael Harte
| 
|-
| Primetime Creative Arts Emmy Awards
| Outstanding Writing for a Nonfiction Program
| Mark Lewis 
| 
| 
|}

See also
Cinephilia – Luka's love of movies like Casablanca, Catch Me If You Can, Basic Instinct and American Psycho are displayed
Internet culture
Postmodern television

References

External links
 
 
 
 Official trailer

2010s American documentary television series
2019 American television series debuts
2019 American television series endings
Documentary films about animal cruelty
English-language Netflix original programming
Films about animal cruelty
Netflix original documentary television series
True crime television series
Television series about cats
Animal killing
BAFTA winners (television series)
Primetime Emmy Award-winning television series